Domingo Mariano Traggia Uribarri, Marquis del Palacio (1744–1816) was a Spanish military commander.

Early career
During the War of the Oranges (1801), he saw service as a colonel in the hussars and in May he was hit by a bullet and received a bayonet wound to the face.

Peninsular War

On 30 June 1808, the Marquis, who had taken up the post of governor of Minorca earlier that month, joined the open mutiny of the Aragonese and Catalan battalions of his army demanding to be transferred to Barcelona to take up arms against the French, was finally able to sail from Port Mahon to mainland Spain.

His immediate superior, the Captain-General at Palma, General Vives, in charge of the corps of 10,000 men stationed in the Balearic Islands, garrisoned at Majorca and Minorca, had been reluctant to leave Port Mahon without troops due to his "deeply rooted idea" that the English would once again control Minorca, as they had done for the greater part of the 18th century. While the Aragonese regiment landed near Tortosa and marched for Saragossa, the bulk of the expeditionary force, nearly 5,000 strong, was put ashore in Catalonia between 19 and 23 July. The Marquis del Palacio was appointed captain general of Catalonia shortly thereafter.

In June 1811, he was appointed captain general of the Kingdom of Valencia and Murcia but was substituted by Blake shortly afterwards.

In October 1812, he was appointed captain general of Extremadura and in February 1813, Wellington named him general in chief of the 5th Army, under captain general Castaños.

Post-war career
He was deputy for Aragon in the Cortes in 1813.

Notes

References

People of the Peninsular War
Spanish commanders of the Napoleonic Wars
19th-century Spanish military personnel
1744 births
1816 deaths